Eduardo de los Santos Castrillo (October 31, 1942 – May 18, 2016) was a renowned Filipino sculptor.

Early life
Eduardo (commonly known as 'Ed') Castrillo was born in Santa Ana, Manila, Philippines, on October 31, 1942, the youngest of five children to Santiago Silva Castrillo and Magdalena De los Santos.  His father worked as a jeweler, while his mother was a leading actress in zarzuelas and Holy Week pageants.

Castrillo's early years were marked by adversity and challenges.  His mother died when he was not yet two, he changed schools several times and he was depressed as a teenager to the point of being suicidal.  He found his place however after he entered the University of Santo Tomas in Manila, where he earned a degree in Fine Arts.  Looking for work following his graduation, he approached Levy Hermanos, the owner of the well-known La Estrella del Norte studio in Manila.  Hermanos challenged him to design a piece of jewelry then and there.  Castrillo responded by producing seven studies, in full color, within twenty minutes.  He was hired on the spot as a jewelry designer.  The year was 1964.

Professional career
Castrillo broke onto the Filipino arts scene in 1966, when he held his first one-man show at the Northern Motors showroom in Makati.  That same year, his first major public sculptures were unveiled – “The Virgin” at La Loma Cemetery and “Youth's Cry of Defiance” in Fort Santiago, both in Metro Manila.  During the 1970s, the height of Martial Law under the Marcos dictatorship, Castrillo was considered to be the most avant-garde sculptor in the Philippines.  By the 1980s, Castrillo's reputation as a leading artist in his country was beyond dispute.  He traveled extensively abroad on cultural visits, giving lectures and conducting research into the origins of early Filipino art.

Castrillo's main medium was metal, especially brass, bronze and steel, from which he created sculptures by hammering, cutting and welding, with the help of a group of assistants.  He also incorporated other materials into his works, including wood, plastic, plexiglass, ivory and even neon lights.  His oeuvre included free-standing abstract pieces, functional art pieces, art jewelry, body sculptures and liturgical art.

As well as being avant-garde, he was known as a nationalist and for his commitment to the Filipino people.  As he told an interviewer from the American news agency, the Associated Press:

Several of Castrillo's most important works are monumental sculptures commemorating Filipino historical events or personalities, including Rajah Sulayman (1976), the People Power Monument (1993), The Battle of Zapote Bridge (1997) and the Bonifacio Shrine (1998).

Outside of the Philippines, his sculptures can be found in France, Singapore, Malaysia and Guam, among other places.

Castrillo served at one time as the head of the Art Association of the Philippines.

Death
Eduardo Castrillo died of cancer on May 18, 2016, at the Asian Hospital in Muntinlupa, Metro Manila.

Awards
Honorable Mention, 18th AAP Annual Sculpture Division, 1967
Major Award (1 of 4) for Death Touch of Joy, 1st National Sculpture Exhibition, 1968
13th Artist Award of the Cultural Center of the Philippines, 1970
Republic Cultural Heritage Award, 1971
Araw ng Maynila Centennial Award, 1971
Ten Outstanding Young Men Award, 1971
Outstanding Makati Resident Award, 1971
Outstanding Sta. Ana Resident Award, 1974
Outstanding Son of Binan Award, Maduro Club, 1980
Outstanding Son of Laguna Award, Laguna Lion's Club, 1981
Adopted Son of Cebu, Charter Day of Cebu, 1996
Green and Gold Artist Award, Far Eastern University, 1998
Most Outstanding Citizen Award of Quezon City, Quezon City Foundation Day, 2003
Helping Citizen Award of Imus City, Imus Recognition Day, 2005

Despite his importance to the Philippine art world and the visibility of his major works, Eduardo Castrillo was never named a National Artist of the Philippines – a fact that one arts observer proclaimed was “nothing short of a scandal”.

Shows (partial listing)
One-Man Show, Northern Motors Showroom, Makati, 1966
One-Man Show, Hilton Art Center, Manila, 1969
One-Man Show, Luz Gallery, Makati, 1969
One-Man Show, Solidaridad, 1971
One-Man Show, Gelerie Bleue, 1971
One-Man Show, Agra Gallery, Washington DC, USA, 1973
One-Man Show, Plaza Hotel, New York City, USA, 1973
One-Man Show, Via de Parigi, Palm Beach, USA, 1973
One-Man Show, Gallery 99, Rome, Italy, 1973
One-Man Show, Impressions Gallery, 1974
One-Man Show, Sanctuary Gallery, 1974

Major works
The Virgin (1966), La Loma Cemetery, Metro Manila
Youth's Cry of Defiance (1966), Fort Santiago, Intramuros, Metro Manila
Fate of the Oppressed (1971)
Consolidated Growth through Education (1974), Polytechnic University of the Philippines, Santa Mesa, Metro Manila
Spirit of Pinaglabanan (1974), San Juan, Metro Manila
The Redemption (1974), Loyola Memorial Park, Marikina, Metro Manila
Pagbubungkas (1975), Philippine Heart Center, Quezon City, Metro Manila
Rajah Sulayman (1976), Plaza Rajah Sulayman, Malate, Metro Manila
Paghimud-os (1975), Bacolod Capitol Lagoon, Bacolod
Mag-Ilusyon (1976), Kalayaan Park (formerly Ferdinand-Imelda Park), Legazpi City, Albay
The Redemption (1977), Metrobank Plaza, Makati, Metro Manila
Cry of Tondo (1978), Plaza Moriones, Tondo, Metro Manila
Inang Bayan (1992), Bantayog ng mga Bayani, Diliman, Quezon City, Metro Manila
People Power Monument (1993) along Epifanio De los Santos Avenue in Quezon City, Metro Manila
The Heritage of Cebu (1995), Cebu City
Battle of Zapote Bridge (1997), Las Piñas
Bonifacio and the Katipunan Revolution Monument (1998), beside Manila City Hall, Metro Manila
Beyond Broadcasting (2000), GMA Network Center, Quezon City, Metro Manila
Golden Tribute to the History of Cebu (2012), Insular Life Cebu Business Center, Cebu Business Park, Cebu City
Mother of All Asia–Tower of Peace (2014), Batangas
San Juan Bautista (2015), Plaza Carriedo, Quiapo Church, Metro Manila
Execution of Rizal, Rizal Park, Metro Manila
Ang Mga Bisig, Philippine International Convention Center, Metro Manila

References

See also
Paras-Perez, Rodolfo. Beyond Art. Manila, Philippines: Vera-Reyes, 1975. (documentation of the "Huling Hapunan", the depiction of the Last Supper with Christ and the Twelve Apostles, a large-scale sculpture project of Eduardo Castrillo)

1942 births
2016 deaths
Filipino sculptors
People from Santa Ana, Manila
Artists from Metro Manila
Artists featured at the Bantayog ng mga Bayani
Catholic sculptors